The Hard Way is a 1916 British silent crime film directed by Walter West and starring Muriel Martin-Harvey, Joseph Tozer and Thomas H. MacDonald. It was the first film to be shot at Broadwest's newly acquired Walthamstow studios. Its plot concerns an English artist's wife who commits bigamy in Paris.

Cast
 Muriel Martin-Harvey - Lilah Chertsey 
 Joseph Tozer - Noel Creighton 
 Thomas H. MacDonald - Arnold Graves 
 Lily Saxby - Clarice Creighton 
 George Bellamy - Lepine 
 Owen Francis - Martin Graves

References

External links

1916 films
1916 crime films
British crime films
1910s English-language films
Films directed by Walter West
British silent feature films
British black-and-white films
1910s British films